Kiana Sādāt-Hosseini renowned as Little Kiana or Kiana of Nishapur  also The Seven-year-old Kiana (2009–2016) was an Iranian seven-year-old Preschool student from Nishapur. She was kidnapped, raped and murdered by her aunt's husband Mehdi N on September 15, 2016. He was hanged in public 15 days later on September 30, 2016, in Nishapur with a special court order signed by Chief Justice Sadegh Larijani.

See also 
 List of kidnappings
 Setayesh Qorayshi

References 

 Persian Wikipedia

2009 births
2010s missing person cases
2016 deaths
2016 murders in Iran
21st-century Iranian people
21st-century Iranian women
Child abuse
Female murder victims
Iranian children
Iranian murder victims
Kidnapped Iranian people
Kidnapped children
Missing person cases in Iran
Murdered Iranian children
People from Nishapur
People from Tehran
Rape in Iran